The monarchy of Papua New Guinea is a system of government in which a hereditary monarch is the sovereign and head of state of Papua New Guinea. The current monarch and head of state, since 8 September 2022, is King Charles III. Although the person of the sovereign is equally shared with 14 other independent countries within the Commonwealth of Nations, each country's monarchy is separate and legally distinct. As a result, the current monarch is officially titled the King of Papua New Guinea and, in this capacity, he and other members of the Royal Family undertake public and private functions domestically and abroad as representatives of the Papua New Guinean state. However, the King is the only member of the Royal Family with any constitutional role. The monarch lives predominantly in the United Kingdom and, while several powers are the sovereign's alone, most of the royal governmental and ceremonial duties in Papua New Guinea are carried out by the monarch's representative, the governor-general.

The responsibilities of the sovereign, and of the governor-general, under the Papua New Guinean constitution, include summoning and dismissing parliament, calling elections, and appointing governments. Further, Royal Assent or the royal sign-manual are required to enact laws, letters patent, and orders in council. But the authority for these acts stems from the country's populace, in which sovereignty is vested, and the monarch's direct participation in any of these areas of governance is limited, with most related powers entrusted for exercise by the elected and appointed parliamentarians, the ministers of the Crown drawn from amongst them, and judges.

History
The British protectorate of the Territory of Papua along the south coast of New Guinea and adjacent islands was proclaimed in 1884. After being fully annexed into the British Empire in 1888, the territory was placed in 1902 under the authority of the Crown in its Australian parliament and council. The northern area of New Guinea was a territory of the imperial German Crown until Australia seized the area during the First World War. After the Second World War, the Territory of Papua and New Guinea was established as a United Nations trust territory administered by Australia. Independence from Australia was granted in 1975.

Road to independent monarchy

Initially, it was expected that Papua New Guinea would adopt a republican constitution on independence, but later Papua New Guinean parliament invited Queen Elizabeth II to be their sovereign and head of state.

Papua New Guinea became independent on 16 September 1975, having been under Australian administration for the previous 60 years, but Papua New Guinean ministers decided that the country still wanted a monarch as its head of state. Papua New Guinean ministers noted the affection the people had for the Queen when she last visited in 1974. They wanted a politically-neutral head of state who could provide unity and continuity, and the government wanted to retain all the traditional knighthoods and decorations.

On 15 August 1975, the Assembly of Papua New Guinea formally adopted the Constitution, invited the Queen to be head of state and asked her to accept Parliament's nomination of John Guise as Governor-General of Papua New Guinea. According to Martin Charteris, the Queen was "both tickled and touched" and that she accepted the role straight away.

According to historian Robert Hardman, Papua New Guinea is "the one part of the world where The Queen is, effectively, an elected monarch".

The Constitution of the Independent State of Papua New Guinea also states that the Queen had been requested by the people of Papua New Guinea, through their Constituent Assembly, to become their Queen and Head of State; and she "graciously consented" so to become.

The Papua New Guinean Crown and its aspects

The sovereign's role as Monarch of Papua New Guinea is distinct to his or her position as monarch of any other realm, including the United Kingdom.

This division is illustrated in a number of ways: The Monarch, for example, holds a unique Papua New Guinean title. Further, when they and other members of the Royal Family are acting in public specifically as representatives of Papua New Guinea, they will use, where possible, Papua New Guinean symbols, including the country's national flag. The sovereign similarly only draws from Papua New Guinean coffers for support in the performance of his duties as monarch of Papua New Guinea; citizens do not pay any money to the Monarch or any other member of the Royal Family, either towards personal income or to support royal residences outside of Papua New Guinea. Normally, tax money pays only for the costs associated with the governor-general as an instrument of the Monarch's authority, including travel, security, residences, offices, ceremonies, and the like.

Title

The monarch holds a unique Papua New Guinean title, granted by the constitution—Charles the Third, King of Papua New Guinea and of His other Realms and Territories, Head of the Commonwealth—though, the monarch is typically styled King of Papua New Guinea and is addressed as such when in Papua New Guinea or performing duties on behalf of Papua New Guinea abroad. 

Colloquially, Queen Elizabeth II was referred to as "Misis Kwin" (Mrs Queen) and as "Mama belong big family" in the creole language of Tok Pisin. Prior to ascending the throne, the then Prince Charles was referred to in Tok Pisin as "Nambawan pikinini bilong Misis Kwin" (The first child of Mrs Queen).

Oath of allegiance
As the embodiment of the state, the monarch is the locus of oaths of Allegiance. This is done in reciprocation to the sovereign's Coronation Oath, wherein they promise to govern the peoples of their realms, "according to their respective laws and customs".

The oath of allegiance in Papua New Guinea is:

Succession

The constitution provides that the King's heirs shall succeed him as head of state. Like some realms, Papua New Guinea defers to United Kingdom law to determine the line of succession.

Succession is by absolute primogeniture governed by the provisions of the Succession to the Crown Act 2013, as well as the Act of Settlement, 1701, and the Bill of Rights, 1689. This legislation limits the succession to the natural (i.e. non-adopted), legitimate descendants of Sophia, Electress of Hanover, and stipulates that the monarch cannot be a Roman Catholic, and must be in communion with the Church of England upon ascending the throne. Though these constitutional laws, as they apply to Papua New Guinea, still lie within the control of the British parliament, both the United Kingdom and Papua New Guinea cannot change the rules of succession without the unanimous consent of the other realms, unless explicitly leaving the shared monarchy relationship; a situation that applies identically in all the other realms, and which has been likened to a treaty amongst these countries.
	
Upon a demise of the Crown (the death or abdication of a sovereign), it is customary for the accession of the new monarch to be publicly proclaimed by the governor-general in the capital, Port Moresby, after the accession. Regardless of any proclamations, the late sovereign's heir immediately and automatically succeeds, without any need for confirmation or further ceremony. An appropriate period of mourning also follows, during which flags across the country are flown at half-mast to honour the late monarch. The day of the funeral is likely to be a public holiday.

Constitutional role

Papua New Guinea shares equally the same monarch with fourteen other monarchies (a grouping, including Papua New Guinea, known as the Commonwealth realms) in the 56-member Commonwealth of Nations. Despite sharing the same person as their respective national monarch, each of the Commonwealth realms—including Papua New Guinea—is sovereign and independent of the others.

The monarchy of Papua New Guinea exists in a framework of a parliamentary representative democracy.

Unlike in most other Commonwealth realms, sovereignty is constitutionally vested in the citizenry of Papua New Guinea and the preamble to the constitution states "that all power belongs to the people—acting through their duly elected representatives". The monarch has been, according to section 82 of the constitution, "requested by the people of Papua New Guinea, through their Constituent Assembly, to become [monarch] and head of State of Papua New Guinea" and thus acts in that capacity. The document thereafter sets out the role and powers of the monarch.

Only Papua New Guinean ministers of the Crown can advise the sovereign on matters of the Papua New Guinean state. The monarch is represented by the governor-general of Papua New Guinea, who is nominated by the National Parliament of Papua New Guinea.

Government

As a constitutional monarch, the monarch acts entirely on the advice of Papua New Guinean Ministers of the Crown.

Most of the monarch's domestic duties are performed by the governor-general, his representative in Papua New Guinea. There are also a few duties which must be specifically performed by, or bills that require assent by the monarch. These include: signing the appointment papers of governors-general, the confirmation of awards of honours, and approving any change in his title. It is also possible that if the governor-general decided to go against the prime minister's or the government's advice, the prime Minister could appeal directly to the monarch, or even recommend that the monarch dismiss the governor-general. No governor-general has been dismissed from office, although in 1991, Sir Vincent Serei Eri resigned from office after Prime Minister Sir Rabbie Namaliu advised the Queen to dismiss him.

All executive powers of Papua New Guinea rest with the sovereign. All laws in Papua New Guinea are enacted only with the granting of Royal Assent, done by the governor-general on behalf of the sovereign. The governor-general is also responsible for proroguing, and dissolving Parliament. The opening of a session of Parliament is accompanied by the Speech from the Throne by the governor-general.

Foreign affairs

The sovereign or governor-general may negotiate and ratify treaties, alliances, and international agreements; and for this no parliamentary approval is required. However, a treaty cannot alter the domestic laws of Papua New Guinea; an Act of Parliament is necessary in such cases. The governor-general, on behalf of the monarch, also accredits Papua New Guinean High Commissioners and ambassadors, and receives diplomats from foreign states.

In addition, the issuance of passports falls under the Royal Prerogative and, as such, all Papua New Guinean passports are issued in the governor-general's name, the monarch's vice-regal representative.

Courts

The Papua New Guinean monarch, on the advice of the National Executive Council, can also grant immunity from prosecution, exercise the royal prerogative of mercy, and pardon offences against the Crown, either before, during, or after a trial. The exercise of the 'Power of Mercy' to grant a pardon and the commutation of prison sentences is described in section 151 of the Constitution.

Cultural role

The King's Official Birthday is a public holiday in Papua New Guinea. In Papua New Guinea, it is usually celebrated on the second Monday of June every year. Official celebrations occur at hotels in Port Moresby, and much of the day is filled with sports matches, fireworks displays, and other celebrations and events. Honours and medals are given for public service to Papua New Guineans, who are mentioned in the King's Birthday Honours List.

The national police force of Papua New Guinea is known as "The Royal Papua New Guinea Constabulary".

The Crown and Honours

Within the Commonwealth realms, the monarch is deemed the fount of honour. Similarly, the monarch, as sovereign of Papua New Guinea, confers awards and honours in Papua New Guinea in his name. Most of them are often awarded on the advice of "His Majesty's Papua New Guinea Ministers".

Papua New Guinea's own national honours and awards system, known as "The Orders of Papua New Guinea", was formally established on 23 August 2005 by authority of the Queen of Papua New Guinea, Elizabeth II. The monarch is the sovereign and head of the Orders of Papua New Guinea. His vice-regal representative, the governor-general, is the chancellor of the Orders of Papua New Guinea and Principal Grand Companion of the Order of Logohu.

The Crown and the Defence Force

The Crown sits at the pinnacle of the Papua New Guinea Defence Force. It is reflected in Papua New Guinea's maritime vessels, which bear the prefix HMPNGS, i.e., His Majesty's Papua New Guinea Ship.

St Edward's Crown appears on Papua New Guinea's Defence Force rank insignia, which illustrates the monarchy as the locus of authority.

Members of the royal family also act as colonels-in-chief of various regiments, reflecting the Crown's relationship with the Defence Force through participation in military ceremonies both at home and abroad. Charles III is the Colonel-in-Chief of Papua New Guinea's Royal Pacific Islands Regiment. In 2012, Charles, dressed in the forest green uniform of the regiment, presented troops with new colours at the Sir John Guise Stadium in Port Moresby.

The Crown and Tok Pisin

In Tok Pisin, Queen Elizabeth II was referred to as Missis Kwin and as Mama belong big family. The Queen's eldest son, Charles was known as Nambawan Pikinini Bilong Misis Kwin (first born child of Missis Kwin). Prince Philip, Duke of Edinburgh was addressed as Oldfella Pili-Pili Him Bilong Misis Kwin.

In October 1982, the Queen gave a famous 'I hope to return' speech in Tok Pisin, watched by thousands under rainy skies, in which she said, "mi hamamas tru long istap wantaim yupla nau, na mi ting bai mi kam bek long lukim yupla lo taim bihain".

In August 1984, Charles, Prince of Wales visited Manus island and in a lavish ceremony was crowned the "10th Lapan of Manus". A feast was organised for this occasion and all the local chiefs were invited. Charles—draped with dogs' teeth necklaces—accepted the title by saying, "Wuroh, wuroh, wuroh, all man meri bilong Manus. Mi hammamas tru" (Tok Pisin: Thank you all men and women of Manus. I am truly filled with happiness).

In 1996, the people of Papua New Guinea presented the Queen with a portrait, titled Missis Kwin. Painted by artist Mathias Kauage, the Queen is shown wearing a Gerua, an important ceremonial headdress traditionally worn by Chieftains in the Highlands of Papua New Guinea. A Gerua is generally made of wood that is carved and then painted in bright colours to resemble the feathers of birds of paradise, and other species. According to the artist, the portrait represents the Queen as Head of the Commonwealth.

Royal visits

Prince Philip, Duke of Edinburgh, visited during an extended Commonwealth tour which lasted from October 1956 until February 1957.

Prince Edward and Katherine, the Duke and Duchess of Kent, visited in 1969 to open the 3rd South Pacific Games in Port Moresby.

The Queen visited Papua New Guinea for the first time, along with Prince Philip and Princess Anne, in February 1974. The Queen returned in 1977 during her Silver Jubilee tour, when she toured the capital Port Moresby, Popondetta and Alotau. At a banquet, the Queen said that when she accepted the office of Head of State, she had hoped that the Crown could play a part in helping to establish and maintain unity. The Queen and the Duke visited again in October 1982.

Charles, Prince of Wales, toured in 1966, while he was a student in Australia. For the independence celebrations in 1975, the Queen of Papua New Guinea was represented by the Prince of Wales. Charles visited again in 1984 to open the new parliament building in Port Moresby.

Prince Andrew, Duke of York visited in 1991 to open the 9th South Pacific Games.

Anne, Princess Royal visited in 2005 for the 30th anniversary of independence celebrations. Among other places, the Princess visited the Bomana War Cemetery, Anglicare Stop Aids centre at Waigani, Cheshire Homes at Hohola, and the Violence Against Women Centre.

The Prince of Wales visited in 2012 on a tour on the occasion of the Queen's Diamond Jubilee. During their time in the country, the Prince and the Duchess met church, charity, and community volunteers, cultural groups, and members of the Papua New Guinea Defence Force in and near Port Moresby.

Prince Andrew, Duke of York, visited in 2015 to open the 15th Pacific Games on the Queen's behalf, and visited Port Moresby (Bomana) War Cemetery.

The Princess Royal visited the country in April 2022 to mark the Queen's Platinum Jubilee. The Princess and her husband Vice Admiral Sir Timothy Laurence carried out various engagements, including visits to a Catholic boarding school, St John Ambulance PNG, the Bomana War Cemetery, Papua New Guinea National Museum and Art Gallery, Port Moresby General Hospital, Vabukori, and Hanuabada.

Public opinion

Among Papua New Guineans, the King and the Royal Family are extremely popular, and there is very little republican sentiment in the country. Governor-General Sir Bob Dadae said that Papua New Guineans are "graciously honoured and proud" to have a monarch as their head of state.

During her visit in 2022 to mark the late Queen Elizabeth II's Platinum Jubilee, the Princess Royal thanked Papua New Guineans for "your loyalty and your respect for Her Majesty that you have shown throughout her reign".

Justin Tkatchenko, Minister for National Events, said in 2022, that the country won't make a transition to a republic, and Papua New Guinea is embracing its monarchy and "making it bigger and better than it was before".

List of Papua New Guinean monarchs

See also

 Lists of office-holders
 List of prime ministers of Elizabeth II
 List of prime ministers of Charles III
 List of Commonwealth visits made by Elizabeth II
 Monarchies in Oceania
 List of monarchies

References

External links
Papua New Guinea at The Royal Family website

Government of Papua New Guinea
Politics of Papua New Guinea
Papua New Guinea
Heads of state of Papua New Guinea
1975 establishments in Papua New Guinea
Papua New Guinea
Kingdoms